Bandinelli is an Italian surname. Notable people with the surname include:

Angelo Maria Bandinelli, 17th-century postmaster general of the Polish–Lithuanian Commonwealth
Bartolommeo Bandinelli (1493–1560), Italian Renaissance sculptor, draughtsman and painter
Filippo Bandinelli (born 1995), Italian footballer
Marco Bandinelli, Italian Baroque painter
Ranuccio Bianchi Bandinelli (1900–1975), Italian archaeologist and art historian
Roberto Bandinelli (died 1650), Florentine merchant and postmaster of the Polish–Lithuanian Commonwealth
Spartaco Bandinelli (1921–1997), Italian boxer

Italian-language surnames